John Thomas Morgan (3 December 1920 – 16 July 2005) was an Australian rules footballer who played with Geelong in the Victorian Football League (VFL).

Originally granted a permit to join Geelong in 1941, Morgan's career was delayed by his service in the Australian Army during World War II.

In 1946, Morgan was granted a permit to move to St Kilda, but he did not play a senior game for them.

Notes

External links 

1920 births
2005 deaths
Australian rules footballers from Victoria (Australia)
Geelong Football Club players